Tora e Piccilli is a comune (municipality) in the Province of Caserta in the Italian region Campania, located about  northwest of Naples and about  northwest of Caserta.

Tora e Piccilli borders the following municipalities: Conca della Campania, Marzano Appio, Presenzano.

References

Cities and towns in Campania